The Constitution of 1983 (formally the Republic of South Africa Constitution Act, 1983) was South Africa's third constitution. It replaced the republican constitution that had been adopted when South Africa became a republic in 1961 and was in force for ten years before it was superseded by the Interim Constitution on 27 April 1994, which in turn led to the current Constitution of South Africa, which has been in force since 1997.

Background

The creation of the 1983 constitution was spearheaded by then-Prime Minister P.W. Botha. It was approved by white voters in a referendum on 2 November 1983, in which 66.3% of ballots cast were in favour of the new constitution.

Provisions

Among the 1983 constitution's most controversial provisions was its establishment of the Tricameral Parliament, a legislative arrangement that would permit the Coloured and Indian race groups to be represented in parliament on a segregated basis, and the abolition of the office of Prime Minister in favour of an executive State Presidency under ruling Prime Minister P. W. Botha.

Opposition

Bill of Rights proposal

The constitutions saw significant opposition from the anti-apartheid Progressive Federal Party. While opposing the utility of white rule, the PFP attempted to incorporate a 'Bill of Rights' into the new constitution proposed by the National Party. The motion was first submitted in August 1983, by Shadow Finance Minister Harry Schwarz. He stated that the Bill should guarantee freedom from discrimination on the ground of race, colour, sex or creed, freedom of conscience and religion, of thought, belief, opinion and expression, including freedom of the press, of association, peaceful assembly and movement, and freedom to pursue the gaining of a livelihood. It also included freedom from deprivation of life, liberty, security and property, except in accordance with the principles of fundamental justice. It would also guarantee equality before the law and equal protection and benefit of law.

Schwarz argued that if included in the constitution of the republic, it would act as a “protector of rights many people had struggled to achieve in South Africa” as well as to “act as an inspiration” to the people of South Africa and would “be a unifying factor in a country in which unity of people is essential for survival”. Helen Suzman, Shadow Law and Order Minister, argued that the exclusion of the bill would lead to "a further loss of civil liberties by all South Africans - in short, to one-party, one-group dictatorship in this country". It was also argued that the bill would be a statement of intent demonstrating that the days of discrimination on the grounds of race or colour had come to an end.

While virtually all MPs of the Progressive Federal Party supported the bill, no other party in Parliament supported it. Rejecting Schwarz’s proposal, Daan van der Merwe of the Conservative Party stated that the bill, based on a “leftist-liberal political philosophy”, would jeopardise the freedom of the white man. New Republic Party leader Vause Raw said Schwarz “a master at platitudes” was seeking idealistic freedoms that did not exist anywhere in the world. Following the rejection of Schwarz’s bill, fellow PFP MPs' Helen Suzman, Colin Eglin, Ray Swart and Dave Dalling attempted a further four times to introduce a Bill of Rights. The Bills were effectively blocked by the National Party by placing them at the end of the order paper.

See also

 P.W. Botha

References

External links

 

 Text of the 1983 Constitution at South African Government Information

Historical constitutions of South Africa
Repealed South African legislation
1983 in South African law
South Africa and the Commonwealth of Nations